Parasyte is a Japanese manga series written and illustrated by Hitoshi Iwaaki. It was originally serialized in the magazine Morning Open Zōkan from 1988 and switched to Monthly Afternoon after a few issues in 1990. It was collected into ten tankōbon volumes by Kodansha, and was later republished in eight kanzenban volumes. It was originally licensed for English translation and North American distribution by Tokyopop, which published the series over 12 volumes. The Tokyopop version ran in Mixxzine. Daily pages from the Tokyopop version ran in the Japanimation Station, a service accessible to users of America Online. The Tokyopop English-language manga went out of print on May 2, 2005. Del Rey Manga later acquired the rights to the series, and published eight volumes following the kanzenban release. Kodansha Comics later republished the volumes in North America between 2011 and 2012. Two tribute manga volumes (Neo Parasyte m and Neo Parasyte f) collecting short stories by various authors were published in 2015 and 2016 (2016 and 2017 in English).

Original Japanese tankōbon release

English Tokyopop release

Kanzenban edition

Parasyte Reversi
A spin-off manga titled Parasyte Reversi, started on Kodansha's Comic Days app on March 2, 2018. It is written and illustrated by Moare Ohta.

References

External links
 Official manga website at Afternoon 

volumes
Parasyte